Sophie Gonzales (born 1992) is an Australian author known for writing young adult queer romantic comedies. She grew up in Whyalla South Australia and lives in Adelaide, Australia. She graduated from the University of Adelaide, and works as a psychologist. Her novel Only Mostly Devastated is a contemporary, queer re-imagining of Grease. Her novel The Law of Inertia, an LGBT mystery novel, was published in 2018 and addressed mental health issues including depression, anxiety and suicide.

Bibliography
 The Law of Inertia (2018, Chicago Review Press)
 Only Mostly Devastated (2020, Wednesday Books)
 Perfect on Paper (2021, Wednesday Books)
 If This Gets Out - co-written with Cale Dietrich (2021, Wednesday Books)
 Never Ever Getting Back Together (2022, Wednesday Books)
 Careful What You Wish For (2023, Wednesday Books)

Critical reception 
Cosmopolitan called Only Mostly Devastated- a queer retelling of the popular film Grease- one of the "17 LGBTQ+ Books Everyone Needs to Read ASAP" in March 2020, and the American Booksellers Association placed it on their Spring 2020 Kids’ Indie Next List. The Junior Library Guild also made it a Gold Standard Selection.

Only Mostly Devastated was a semi-finalist in the Goodreads Choice Awards in the category of Best Young Adult fiction. It was also listed as a finalist in the Southern Independent Booksellers Alliance's Southern Book Prize, and shortlisted for the Waterstones Children's Book Prize for Older Fiction in 2021.

References

External links
 Personal website

1993 births
Living people
21st-century Australian novelists
21st-century Australian women writers
Australian women novelists